Liam Gerrard is a British-Irish film, television and theatre actor.  He is also an acclaimed voice-over artist and audiobook narrator. He is best known for his BAFTA-nominated work: Walter Tull: Britain's First Black Officer, Peterloo and Coronation Street. To date he has narrated over 100 audiobooks.

Early life
Gerrard was born and grew up in Kingston upon Hull before moving to Dubai in his early teens studying at the English College Dubai, before studying at Lancaster University and training at Mountview Academy of Theatre Arts.

Career
Gerrard made his film debut in the 2007 Hollywood film Death Defying Acts playing a reporter.  The film also starred Guy Pearce, Catherine Zeta-Jones, Timothy Spall and Saoirse Ronan.  He made his television debut in 2008 appearing in the television series Hollyoaks.  In 2008 he starred in 6 WKD Original Vodka comedy television commercials leading their have you got a WKD side? campaign.  He has appeared in over 50 plays.  In 2006 he appeared in two British Shakespeare Company productions; A Midsummer Night's Dream and Romeo and Juliet alongside Wayne Sleep, Mina Anwar, Sean Brosnan and David Davies. The productions toured the United Kingdom extensively and transferred to Ramme Gaard under the patronage of Petter Olsen.  In 2008 he joined Northern Broadsides and toured the UK with a production of Romeo and Juliet. He went on to play the juvenile lead in Theatre by the Lake's world premiere of Melvyn Bragg's The Maid of Buttermere. He subsequently appeared in two more productions at Theatre by the Lake; Tom's Midnight Garden and The Night Before Christmas.  Other notable stage appearances include:  Miss Julie the 4-hand David Eldridge adaptation, directed by Sarah Frankcom at the Royal Exchange;(also starring Maxine Peake, Joe Armstrong and Carla Henry),  A Christmas Carol at both the Stephen Joseph Theatre and in later years at The Dukes, Jekyll & Hyde at the New Wimbledon Theatre, Will Scarlett in Robin and Marian at the New Vic Theatre.  In 2015 he appeared in the Royal Lyceum Theatre (Edinburgh) production of Caucasian Chalk Circle.  The show received 4 and 5 star national reviews and won 4 Critics' Awards for Theatre in Scotland.  The Telegraph hailed the show 'A Triumph'. He is the youngest person to play the title role of Prospero in London theatre, in the 2013 Watford Palace production of The Tempest.  In 2014 he appeared in the 4-hander triptych piece Symphony written by Ella Hickson, Nick Payne and Tom Wells for Nabokov and Soho Theatre.  The show won a Musical Theatre Network award for best new musical at the Edinburgh Fringe then toured the UK before transferring to London's West End. In late 2018 he played Tom Snout (Wall) in the Crucible Theatre production of A Midsummer Night's Dream.

Gerrard also works extensively as a voiceover artist and was nominated for a BAFTA for his film Walter Tull: Britain's First Black Officer.  He has narrated over 100 audiobooks including the Tom Delonge series Poet Anderson.

Filmography (selected TV / film)
Coronation Street
Peterloo
Walter Tull: Britain's First Black Officer
Death Defying Acts
Butterfly
Arch
Cancer Scare
Toolwire
Hollyoaks
Hollyoaks Later

Selected theatre
A Midsummer Night's Dream – Crucible Theatre
Robin Hood – New Vic Theatre
Caucasian Chalk Circle – Royal Lyceum Theatre
Symphony – Soho Theatre, Nabokov
The Life and Times of Mitchell and Kenyon – Oldham Coliseum Theatre
A Christmas Carol – The Dukes (Lancaster)
Miss Julie – Royal Exchange, Manchester
The Tempest – Watford Palace Theatre
Soul Man (Rigoletto) – Stephen Joseph Theatre
Tom's Midnight Garden – Theatre by the Lake
A Christmas Carol – Stephen Joseph Theatre
The Night Before Christmas – Theatre by the Lake
The Maid of Buttermere – Theatre by the Lake
Romeo and Juliet – Northern Broadsides
A Midsummer Night's Dream – Derby Playhouse
Romeo and Juliet – British Shakespeare Company
Jekyll & Hyde – New Wimbledon Theatre
The Beauty Queen of Leenane
Mrs. Warren's Profession – Judi Dench Theatre

Audiobook selected bibliography
Poet Anderson: The Dream Walker series by Tom DeLonge
Poet Anderson ...of Nightmares by Tom DeLonge
Poet Anderson: ...In Darkness by Tom DeLonge
Pink Mist by Owen Sheers
The Seven Basic Plots by Christopher Booker
Shtum by Jim Lester
The Secret Life by Andrew O'Hagan
The Near East by Arthur Cotterell
Little Caesar by Tommy Wieringa
The Enigma of Reason by Hugo Mercier and Dan Sperber
Rome: An Empire's Story by Greg Woolf
Palaces of Pleasure by Lee Jackson
The Infinite Desire for Growth by Daniel Cohen
The Demon in Democracy by Ryszard Legutko
Game of Thrones Psychology by Travis Langley
Deception of A Highlander Series:
Deception of A Highlander
Possession of a Highlander by Madeline Martin
Enchantment of a Highlander by Madeline Martin
Brutal by James Alerdice
The Inspired Leader by Andy Bird
Human by Mark Britnell
Nicotine by Gregor Hens
The Hidden Village by Imogen Matthews
Humankind: Solidarity with Nonhuman People by Timothy Morton
What We Think About When We Think About Soccer by Simon Critchley
Blackout by Sam Grenfall
DI Mariner Series by Chris Collett:
Deadly Lies by Chris Collett
Innocent Lies by Chris Collett
Killer Lies by Chris Collett
Half Life by Sarah Gray
Dangerous Skies by Brian James
Blood and Guts by Richard Hollingham
Descent: My Epic Fall From Cycling by Thomas Dekker (cyclist)
Beeronomics by Johan Swinnen and Devin Briski
Key Performance Indicators by David Parmenter
Billy Budd by Herman Melville
All For Love Series by Karen Ranney
To Wed and Heiress by Karen Ranney
To Love a Duchess by Karen Ranney
To Bed the Bride Karen Ranney (awaiting publication)
Trading With The Enemy by Hugo Meijer
The Ultimate Colin Wilson by Colin Wilson
To Fight Against This Age by 
Strategy Builder by Stephen Cummings and Duncan Angwin
Build It – The Rebel Playbook for World-Class Employee Engagement by Glenn Elliott and Debra Corey
Eurotragedy by Ashoka Mody
The Open Society and Its Enemies by Karl Popper
This Searing Light, the Sun and Everything Else – Joy Division by Jon Savage
A Short History of Financial Euphoria by John Kenneth Galbraith

Awards and nominations

References

External links 
 
 
 

Living people
English
Alumni of Lancaster University
Alumni of Grizedale College, Lancaster
Alumni of the University of East Anglia
English
English
English
British voice actors
English male voice actors
Male actors from Kingston upon Hull
Year of birth missing (living people)